Eda Karataş (born June 15, 1995) is a Turkish women's football defender, who   plays in the Women's Super League for ALG Spor  with jersey number 52. She is a member of the Turkish national team.

Early life 
Eda Karataş was born to Fahri Karataş and his wife Zeliha in Beykoz district of Istanbul Province on June 15, 1995. She has three sisters.

She completed her secondary education at Ataşehir Mevlana High School in Istanbul.

Club career 

She received her license on March 7, 2007, for Marmara Üniversitesi Spor, where she played until October 2012. In the 2012–13 season, Eda Karataş transferred to Trabzon İdmanocağı. In the 2013–14 season, she stood away from football, returned however to the football field in the beginning of the 2014–15 season. In the second half of the 2016–17 season, Karataş signed with İlkadım Belediyesi Yabancılar Pazarı Spor. After playing in the first half of the 2018–19 First League season for Kireçburnu Spor, she transferred to Ataşehir Belediyespor.

In the 2021–22 Women's  Super League season, she transferred to ALG Spor.  She enjoyed her team's league champion title. On 18 August 2022, she debuted in the 2022–23 UEFA Women's Champions League.

International career 
Elif Deniz was called up to the Turkey girls' U-15 national team, and debuted in the match against Georgia at the 2010 Summer Youth Olympics and scored one goal. She capped seven times for the Turkey U-15 team.

In June 2010, she became member of the Turkey girls' U-17 national team playing in the International Friendship Tournament matches. She played in all matches oat the 2011 UEFA Women's Under-17 Championship qualifying round Group 6, and of 2012 UEFA Women's Under-17 Championship qualifying round Group 7. Karataş capped 12 times and scored two goals for the Turkey girls' U-17 team.

She played her first ever match for the Turkey women's U-19 national team against Ukraine at the Kuban Spring Tournament in 2011. She took part at the 2012 UEFA Women's Under-19 Championship – Group A matches. The UEFA named her one of the "10 most talented footballers" of the championship. She capped in total 16 times for the Turkey women's U-19 national team and scored two goals.

On June 21, 2012, Eda Karataş debuted in the UEFA Women's Euro 2013 qualifying – Group 2 match against Spain for the Turkey women's national team.

Career statistics

Honours 
 Turkish Women's First Football league
 Trabzon İdmanocağı
 Third places (1): 2014–15

 ALG Spor
 Winners (1): 2021-22

References

External links 
 

1995 births
Living people
People from Beykoz
Footballers from Istanbul
Turkish women's footballers
Women's association football defenders
Turkey women's international footballers
Footballers at the 2010 Summer Youth Olympics
Marmara Üniversitesi Spor players
Trabzon İdmanocağı women's players
İlkadım Belediyespor players
Kireçburnu Spor players
Ataşehir Belediyespor players
Turkish Women's Football Super League players
ALG Spor players